Daniil Sergeyevich Burkenya (born July 20, 1978 in Ashgabat, Turkmen SSR) is a Russian track and field athlete who competes mainly in triple jump. He was a long jumper before taking up triple jumping in 2004, and the same year he won the bronze medal in the 2004 Summer Olympics.

International competitions

Personal bests
Long jump - 8.31 m (2001)
Triple jump - 17.68 m (2004)

References

1978 births
Living people
Sportspeople from Ashgabat
Russian male triple jumpers
Russian male long jumpers
Olympic male triple jumpers
Olympic male long jumpers
Olympic athletes of Russia
Olympic bronze medalists for Russia
Olympic bronze medalists in athletics (track and field)
Athletes (track and field) at the 2000 Summer Olympics
Athletes (track and field) at the 2004 Summer Olympics
Athletes (track and field) at the 2008 Summer Olympics
Medalists at the 2004 Summer Olympics
World Athletics Championships athletes for Russia
Russian Athletics Championships winners
Turkmenistan people of Russian descent